Izbicko  (German: Stubendorf) is a village in Strzelce County, Opole Voivodeship, in south-western Poland. It is the seat of the gmina (administrative district) called Gmina Izbicko, which has been bilingual in Polish and German since 2006.

Before 1945 the area was part of Germany (see Territorial changes of Poland after World War II).

The village has a population of 1,100.

References

Izbicko

it:Izbicko